Robert Lauder was a Scottish prelate and nuncio of the 15th century.

Robert Lauder may also refer to:
 Sir Robert Lauder of Quarrelwood (died c. 1370), Justiciar of Scotia
 Sir Robert de Lawedre of Edrington (died 1425), Hostage for King James I of Scotland
 Sir Robert Lauder of the Bass (c. 1440 – 1508), armiger, and governor of the castle at Berwick-upon-Tweed
 Robert Lauder of the Bass (died 1576) (c. 1504 – 1576), Lord of The Bass and land magnate in Haddingtonshire, Berwickshire, and Fife
 Sir Robert Lauder of Popill (died 1575), member of the old Scottish Parliament
 Sir Robert Lauder of Beilmouth (died 1709), armiger, lawyer, and Clerk of Exchequer in Scotland
 Robert Scott Lauder (1803–1869), Scottish mid-Victorian artist